Cephalothricidae is a family of worms belonging to the order Palaeonemertea.

Genera:
 Astemma Örsted, 1843 
 Balionemertes Sundberg, Gibson & Olsson, 2003  
 Cephalothrix Örsted, 1843

References

Palaeonemertea
Nemertea families